Shur Ab (also Romanized as Shūr Āb) is a village in Shakhen Rural District, in the Central District of Birjand County, South Khorasan Province, Iran. At the 2016 census, its population was 69, in 29 families.

References 

Populated places in Birjand County